Dichlorotris(triphenylphosphine)ruthenium(II) is a coordination complex of ruthenium. It is a chocolate brown solid that is soluble in organic solvents such as benzene. The compound is used as a precursor to other complexes including those used in homogeneous catalysis.

Synthesis and basic properties
RuCl2(PPh3)3 is the product of the reaction of ruthenium trichloride trihydrate with a methanolic solution of triphenylphosphine.

2 RuCl3(H2O)3 + 7 PPh3 → 2 RuCl2(PPh3)3 + 2 HCl + 5 H2O + OPPh3

The coordination sphere of RuCl2(PPh3)3 can be viewed as either five-coordinate or octahedral. One coordination site is occupied by one of the hydrogen atoms of a phenyl group. This Ru---H agostic interaction is long (2.59 Å) and weak. The low symmetry of the compound is reflected by the differing lengths of the Ru-P bonds: 2.374, 2.412, and 2.230 Å. The Ru-Cl bond lengths are both 2.387 Å.

Reactions
In the presence of excess of triphenylphosphine, RuCl2(PPh3)3 binds a fourth phosphine to give black RuCl2(PPh3)4. The triphenylphosphine ligands in both the tris(phosphine) and tetrakis(phosphine) complexes are readily substituted by other ligands. The tetrakis(phosphine) complex is a precursor to the Grubbs catalysts.

Dichlorotris(triphenylphosphine)ruthenium(II) reacts with hydrogen in the presence of base to give the purple-colored monohydride HRuCl(PPh3)3.
RuCl2(PPh3)3 + H2 + NEt3 → HRuCl(PPh3)3 + [HNEt3]Cl

Dichlorotris(triphenylphosphine)ruthenium(II) reacts with carbon monoxide to produce the all trans isomer of dichloro(dicarbonyl)bis(triphenylphosphine)ruthenium(II).
RuCl2(PPh3)3 + 2 CO → trans,trans,trans-RuCl2(CO)2(PPh3)2 + PPh3
This kinetic product isomerizes to the cis adduct during recrystallization. trans-RuCl2(dppe)2 forms upon treating RuCl2(PPh3)3 with dppe.
RuCl2(PPh3)3 + 2 dppe → RuCl2(dppe)2 + 3 PPh3

RuCl2(PPh3)3 catalyzes the decomposition of formic acid into carbon dioxide and hydrogen gas in the presence of an amine.  Since carbon dioxide can be trapped and hydrogenated on an industrial scale, formic acid represents a potential storage and transportation medium.

Use in organic synthesis
RuCl2(PPh3)3 facilitates oxidations, reductions, cross-couplings, cyclizations, and isomerization. It is used in the Kharasch addition of chlorocarbons to alkenes.

Dichlorotris(triphenylphosphine)ruthenium(II) serves as a precatalyst for the hydrogenation of alkenes, nitro compounds, ketones, carboxylic acids, and imines.  On the other hand, it catalyzes the oxidation of alkanes to tertiary alcohols, amides to t-butyldioxyamides, and tertiary amines to α-(t-butyldioxyamides) using tert-butyl hydroperoxide. Using other peroxides, oxygen, and acetone, the catalyst can oxidize alcohols to aldehydes or ketones. Using dichlorotris(triphenylphosphine)ruthenium(II) the N-alkylation of amines with alcohols is also possible (see "borrowing hydrogen").

RuCl2(PPh3)3 efficiently catalyzes carbon-carbon bond formation from cross couplings of alcohols through C-H activation of sp3 carbon atoms in the presence of a Lewis acid.

References

Ruthenium complexes
Triphenylphosphine complexes
Chloro complexes
Ruthenium(II) compounds
Reagents for organic chemistry